The 2019–20 season is Salford City's 80th season in their existence and first ever season in League Two following the club's promotion via the play-offs last season. Along with competing in League Two, the club will also participate in the FA Cup, League Cup and EFL Trophy.

The season covers the period from 1 July 2019 to 30 June 2020.

Pre-season
The Ammies announced pre-season friendlies against Atherton Collieries, Woking, Middlesbrough and FC Halifax Town.

Competitions

League Two

League table

Results summary

Results by matchday

Matches
On Thursday, 20 June 2019, the EFL League Two fixtures were revealed.

FA Cup

The first round draw was made on 21 October 2019.

EFL Cup

The first round draw was made on 20 June.

EFL Trophy

On 9 July 2019, the pre-determined group stage draw was announced with Invited clubs to be drawn on 12 July 2019. The draw for the second round was made on 16 November 2019 live on Sky Sports. The third round draw was confirmed on 5 December 2019. The semi-final draw was made on Quest by Ian Holloway and Paul Heckingbottom, on 25 January 2020.

Transfers

Transfers in

Transfers out

Loans in

Loans out

References

Salford City
Salford City F.C. seasons